Summit Entertainment is an American film production and distribution company. It is a label of Lionsgate Films, owned by Lionsgate Entertainment and is headquartered in Santa Monica, California.

History

Independent era (1991–2012) 
Summit Entertainment was founded in 1991 by film producers Bernd Eichinger, Arnon Milchan, and Andrew G. Vajna  to handle film sales in foreign countries. Summit officially launched in 1993 by Patrick Wachsberger, Bob Hayward, and David Garrett under the name Summit Entertainment LP as a distribution and sales organization. By 1995 they were producing and co-financing films, and by 1997 they started fully financing films. Among the company's early successes was American Pie, which Summit distributed outside of English-speaking territories. In 2006, it became an independent film studio with over a billion dollars in financing backed by Merrill Lynch. 

After a string of flops including P2, Never Back Down and Sex Drive, Summit found success in November 2008 with the release of Twilight, a teen romance about vampires based on the best-selling book of the same name by Stephenie Meyer that made $408,773,703 worldwide. In the spring of 2009, Summit released Knowing, the company's second movie to open #1 at the box office and made $182,492,056 worldwide.

In November 2009, Summit released the sequel to Twilight titled The Twilight Saga: New Moon, also based on the popular novel by Stephenie Meyer, breaking box office records for first weekend grosses at the time, taking in $142,839,137 in the first three days. In June 2010 Summit released the third film of the Twilight series, The Twilight Saga: Eclipse. It broke a midnight screening record of over $30 million and set a one-day Wednesday record of $68.5 million. It became the first movie in the series to cross the $300 million mark domestically.

In 2008, Summit Entertainment ranked in eighth place among the studios, with a gross of $226.5 million, almost entirely because of the release of Twilight. In 2009, Summit ranked 7th among studios with a gross of $482.5 million.

Other Summit Entertainment releases include: Ender's Game (released November 1, 2013 in the United States; an adaptation of Orson Scott Card's 1985 novel); Next Day Air ($10,027,047 US box office); The Hurt Locker ($16,400,000 US box office; it garnered Summit its first Best Picture Oscar); the animated Astro Boy; teen horror film Sorority Row ($11,965,282 US box office); the low-budget Push ($31,811,527 US box office); Bandslam ($5,210,988 US box office); Letters to Juliet ($53,032,453 US box office); and, the sleeper hit, RED ($87,940,198 US box office; nominated for a 2010 Golden Globe in the Best Motion Picture – Comedy or Musical category).

Lionsgate era (2012–present) 
On February 1, 2009, it was announced that Lionsgate would acquire Summit Entertainment, along with its library of six films and rights to the Twilight franchise, but two days later, these merger negotiations broke down due to concerns over changing content. On January 13, 2012, Lionsgate officially acquired Summit Entertainment for $412.5 million. Lionsgate continues to operate Summit Entertainment as a label.

See also 
 List of Summit Entertainment films
 Lionsgate
 Smith v. Summit Entertainment LLC

References

External links
  (Now redirects to Lionsgate's website)

1991 establishments in California
2012 mergers and acquisitions
American companies established in 1991
American independent film studios
Companies based in Santa Monica, California
Entertainment companies established in 1991
Film distributors of the United States
Film production companies of the United States
Home video companies of the United States
Lionsgate subsidiaries
International sales agents